Minister of State for Foreign Affairs may refer to:

Minister of State for Foreign Affairs (Pakistan)
Minister of State for Foreign Affairs (United Kingdom)